Stavyshche is an urban-type settlement in Bila Tserkva Raion, Kyiv Oblast (province) in northern Ukraine, on the Hnylyi Tikych river. It hosts the administration of Stavyshche settlement hromada, one of the hromadas of Ukraine. Population: . In 2001, population was 7,929.

History
At the end of the 16th century on the territory that belonged to the Bila Tserkva starosta S.Lubomirski appeared a small settlement that was named as Lubomir. However, after several raids by Crimean Tatars it was razed. Only separate dwellings have survived among the local ponds. Note, the word stav in both Polish and Ukrainian languages means a pond, while suffix -shche (-shcha) means a geographic area, land. At the beginning of the 17th century the village of Stavyshche is mentioned in a list of the Ruzinski's domain. It is the first recorded mentioning of its existence. In 1622 it is already mentioned as one of villages of magnate Chodkiewicz in Kiev Voivodeship and was relieved of all taxes due its impoverishment by suffering from raids by Crimean Tatars and permanent stationing in the area of the Polish Royal troops. In 1635 Stavyshche was mentioned already as a town that had defensive fortifications and military garrison. It was granted the rights of Magdeburg law, according to which the local craftsmen were joining in crafts shops.

The town joined the Khmelnytsky Uprising of 1648-54. Just before the uprising one of Khmelnytskyi's envoys Yarema Konchevskyi who arrived to the town was reassured by its residents that the city's guns will not cause harm to the insurgents. It became a company (hundred) center of Bila Tserkva Regiment. In 1655 Bohdan Khmelnytsky engaged the Polish-Tatars army in battle at Stavyshche.

A decade later the town was the center of the Varenytsia Uprising. Its inhabitants did not accept the town’s return to Polish rule (1667) and rebelled repeatedly in the course of the next century (1702—04, 1730s, 1750s). With the partition of Poland in 1793, Stavyshche was annexed by Russia, and became part of Tarashcha county in the Kiev Governorate.

In the 19th century it acquired a distillery, flour mill, and brick factory. By 1900 its population had reached 8,500. Today the town has a construction company and a food industry.

Until 18 July 2020, Stavyshche was the administrative center of Stavyshche Raion. The raion was abolished that day as part of the administrative reform of Ukraine, which reduced the number of raions of Kyiv Oblast to seven. The area of Stavyshche Raion was merged into Bila Tserkva Raion.

Notable people
Mykola Melnyk, a Chernobyl hero helicopter pilot, was born and grew up in Stavyshche.
 Anatoliy Zlenko, Soviet and Ukrainian diplomat
 Maksym Slavinsky, Ukrainian diplomat
 Nina Preobrazhenskaya, Soviet rower
 Avraham Herzfeld, an Israeli politician and Zionist activist

References

External links
 Stavisht (Stavyshche, Ukraine)
 Guidebook (digitized tour book)
 Stavyshche at The History of Cities and Villages of the Ukrainian SSR
 Watch the youtube-channel «Stavyshche stable» on historical, cultural, touristic and everyday life in Stavyshche

Urban-type settlements in Bila Tserkva Raion